Agrifood systems encompass the primary production of food and non-food agricultural products, as well as in food storage, aggregation, post-harvest handling, transportation, processing, distribution, marketing, disposal and consumption. Within agrifood systems, food systems comprise all food products that originate from crop and livestock production, forestry, fisheries and aquaculture, and from other sources such as synthetic biology, and that are intended for human consumption.

Agrifood systems have three main components:

 primary production, which includes food from agricultural and non-agricultural origins, as well as non-food agricultural products that serve as inputs to other industries;
 food distribution that links production to consumption through food supply chains and domestic food transport networks. Food supply chains include all actors and activities involved in post-harvest handling, storage, aggregation, transport, processing, distribution and marketing of food; and 
 household consumption, which is the downstream outcome of functioning agrifood systems, subject to varying degrees of demand shocks, such as loss of income, depending on the proportion of vulnerable groups in the population. The higher this proportion, the more difficult it is to protect food security and nutrition from shocks.

The world's agrifood systems comprise a gargantuan global enterprise that each year produces approximately 11 billion tonnes of food and a multitude of non-food products, including 32 million tonnes of natural fibres and 4 billion m3 of wood. The estimated gross value of agricultural output in 2018 was US$3.5 trillion. Primary production alone provides about one-quarter of all employment globally, more than half in sub-Saharan Africa and almost 60 percent in low-income countries. Including middle and downstream segments – from food storage and processing to transportation, retailing and consumption – agrifood systems are the backbone of many economies. Even in the European Union, the food and beverage industry employs more people than any other manufacturing sector.

Challenges

Hunger and malnutrition 
Hunger is increasing, and more so in countries affected by conflict, climate extremes and economic downturns, and with high income inequality. The magnitude and severity of food crises also worsened in 2020 as protracted conflict, the economic fallout of the COVID-19 pandemic and weather extremes exacerbated pre-existing fragilities. Economic downturns in 2020, including those resulting from COVID-19 restrictions, delivered the hardest blow in decades to those suffering from hunger, increasing the number of undernourished people by 118 million in 2020 alone and illustrating the devastating impact of a shock that occurs alongside existing vulnerabilities. According to Béné et al. (2020), there is little evidence of reduced food supply (beyond initial disruptions due to panic buying), which may be attributable to government exemptions for the agrifood sector. However, lockdowns and other mobility restrictions drastically reduced the movement of people and goods, which impacted livelihoods. Loss of income and purchasing power sharply reduced the food security and nutrition of billions of people, particularly in low-income and middle-income countries. Families were forced to shift consumption to cheaper, less nutritious foods at a time when they needed to protect and strengthen their immune system. Reduced access to nutritious food and a shift to low-quality and energy-dense diets triggered by the economic impacts of the COVID-19 pandemic, also risk increasing the levels of overweight and obesity in almost all regions of the world. Adult obesity is on the rise with no reversal in the trend at global or regional level for more than 15 years, increasing the non-communicable diseases associated with those forms of malnutrition.

Demographic and environmental pressures 
To feed a world population forecast to reach 9.7 billion in 2050, FAO estimates that agriculture may need to produce 40–54 percent more food, feed and biofuel feedstock than in 2012, depending on the scenario. Urbanization and greater affluence are shifting diets in many low-income and middle-income countries towards increased consumption of more resource-intensive animal source and processed food. If those trends continue, by 2030, diet-related health costs linked to non-communicable diseases will exceed US$1.3 trillion a year, while the annual cost of associated greenhouse gas (GHG) emissions will exceed US$1.7 trillion.

This increased food demand is compounded by shocks and stresses, including more frequent and intense extreme and slow-onset events due to climate change, which threaten both agricultural production – crops, livestock, aquaculture, fisheries and forestry – and the middle and downstream stages of agrifood systems. But as agrifood systems are affected by climate shocks and stresses, they are themselves a major driver of climate change.

Resilience of agrifood systems 
The resilience of agrifood systems refers to the capacity over time of agrifood systems, in the face of any disruption, to sustainably ensure availability of and access to sufficient, safe and nutritious food for all, and sustain the livelihoods of agrifood systems' actors. According to FAO, truly resilient agrifood systems must have a robust capacity to prevent, anticipate, absorb, adapt and transform in the face of any disruption, with the functional goal of ensuring food security and nutrition for all and decent livelihoods and incomes for agrifood systems' actors. Such resilience addresses all dimensions of food security, but focuses specifically on stability of access and sustainability, which ensure food security in both the short and the long term.

Defining agrifood systems resilience 
The resilience of agrifood systems builds on the concept of resilience, which originated in the study of ecosystems and evolved over 50 years into an object of study across an array of disciplines, including engineering, agriculture, economics and psychology. Although there is little agreement today as to a precise definition across disciplines, broadly speaking, resilience can be defined as the dynamic capacity to continue to achieve goals despite disturbances.

In a call for cross-sectoral collaboration to prevent, anticipate, absorb, adapt and transform in the face of shocks and stresses across all sectors of society, the United Nations has developed and adopted the UN Common Guidance on Helping Build Resilient Societies. Since there is a wide variety of risks relating to understanding resilience, the UN offers the following definition: "the ability of individuals, households, communities, cities, institutions, systems and societies to prevent, anticipate, absorb, adapt, and transform positively, efficiently and effectively when faced with a wide range of risks, while maintaining an acceptable level of functioning and without compromising long-term prospects for sustainable development, peace and security, human rights and well-being for all." Resilience building is a system-wide multi-risk, multi-actor and multisectoral effort.

In 2021, FAO released the first definition of agrifood systems and agrifood systems’ resilience in The State of Food and Agriculture 2021 – Making agrifood systems more resilient to shocks and stresses. The definition of agrifood systems' resilience is adapted from Tendall et al.'s definition of food system resilience, which is “capacity over time of a food system and its units at multiple levels, to provide sufficient, appropriate and accessible food to all, in the face of various and even unforeseen disturbances”. Agrifood systems are broader than food systems, as these encompass the entire range of actors and their interlinked value-adding activities in the primary production of food and non-food agricultural products, as well as in food storage, aggregation, post-harvest handling, transportation, processing, distribution, marketing, disposal and consumption.

Disruptions to agrifood systems 
Agrifood systems are exposed to shocks and stresses of various types that differ in nature and intensity, including those impair agrifood systems by disrupting the operations of related institutions, supply chains and actors.

Shocks 
Shocks are sort-term deviations from long-term trends that have substantial negative effects on a system, people's state of well-being, assets, livelihoods, safety and ability to withstand future shocks. Shocks impacting on agrifood systems may be covariate (an event that directly affects groups of households, communities, regions or even entire countries) or idiosyncratic (an event that affects individuals or households) and include disasters, extreme climate events, biological and technological events, surges in plant and animal diseases and pests, socio-economic crises and conflicts.

Stresses 
Stresses are long-term trends or pressures that undermine the stability of a system and increase vulnerability within it. Stresses can result from natural resource degradation, urbanization, demographic pressure, climate variability, political instability or economic decline.

How shocks and stresses affect agrifood systems 
The same shock or stress may have different impacts across the different components of agrifood systems, depending on their characteristics, risk environments, and inherent vulnerabilities and capacities. For example, given its reliance on natural processes, the agriculture sector is disproportionately exposed and vulnerable to adverse climate-related events, especially droughts, floods and storms. Over half of all shocks to crop production are the result of extreme weather events, reinforcing concern about the vulnerability of arable systems to climatic and meteorological volatility. In aquatic systems, there are well-established linkages between harvesting of fish, ocean productivity and global meteorology. Global climate plays a major role in fluctuating fishery productivity.

Because agrifood systems are dependent on agricultural and natural ecosystems and encompass numerous actors along several interlinked components – from production to consumption – a shock or stress, impacting on any component, will not only affect the actors in it but will spread throughout systems upstream or downstream, eventually impacting on many if not all other actors and components.

Elements for resilience 
Resilience-building involves a mix of prevention, anticipation, and the capacity to absorb, adapt, and transform following a disruption. Policies and investments that reduce poverty, generate decent employment and expand access to education and basic services, as well as social protection programmes when needed, are essential building blocks of resilience.

Diverse food sourcing 
Diverse sourcing of food, such as through international trade, is a key strategy for building agrifood systems' resilience because it buffers the food supply against shocks and stresses. Although international trade buffers against domestic shocks, it increases exposure to external shocks and can itself become a channel of shock transmission, therefore having diverse international trade partners is key. Enhancing diversity in terms of commodities is also essential for ensuring the supply of food necessary for healthy diets. However, evidence on the diversity of food supply in terms of domestic production, imports and stocks reveal that the potential of international trade is not equally well exploited in all countries. Low-income countries, such as in sub-Saharan Africa, are among those with the lowest diversity of imports as the food supply is mostly determined by what is produced for the domestic market.

Diverse food supply chain types 
A mix of traditional, transitional and modern food supply chains can help buffer shocks and stresses of different types because the vulnerabilities and resilience capacities of food supply chains are shaped largely by their structural characteristics and product attributes:

 traditional chains are spatially short, involve a small number of local intermediaries, but lack product diversification, quality and safety standards, and economies of scale;
 transitional supply chains are spatially longer, with many small and medium agrifood enterprises (SMAEs) handling midstream processing and distribution;
 modern chains, which supply large urban populations mainly with horticultural and animal products, are dominated by multinationals in their midstream and downstream segments.

The limited resources available to small-scale producers and small and medium agrifood enterprises (SMAEs) often make recovery following a disruption more difficult. SMAEs tend to be labour-intensive with limited capacity to manage risks associated with product perishability and seasonality. Being heavily interdependent, disruption anywhere in the supply chain can produce a harmful cascading effect. FAO suggests that facilitating access to credit and information can create synergies between efficiency and resilience that accelerate recovery. Governments can also support better coordination and organization of SMAEs within food supply chains. One approach is to form consortia, which increase the scale, visibility and influence of small businesses and facilitate access to private and government funding. Nurturing inter-organizational relationships in networks or strategic alliances can generate relational, structural and cognitive capital, promote more robust and effective risk management through resource pooling, and improve access to modern technologies and know-how. Territorial development tools such as clusters can also ease credit constraints, facilitate human development programmes and the diffusion of digital technologies.

Robust transport networks 
According to FAO, robust transport networks can prevent or limit increases in travel time – and consequent impacts on food costs – when an adverse event limits or prevents access to critical network links. For example, flooding, whether from flash floods or from longer-term stagnant flooding, reduces the connectivity of any transport network, impacting the movement of people, goods and societal functioning in general. Damage from flooding can indirectly affect larger areas for a longer period of time, such as when there are traffic delays and congestion on alternative routes, increased journey distances/durations, increased fuel consumption and associated greenhouse gas (GHG) emissions. Due to climate change, transport networks are increasingly being exposed to extreme weather events. A study on the transport networks of 90 countries finds that where food is transported more locally and where the network is denser – such as in high-income countries and densely populated countries like China, India, Nigeria and Pakistan –, systematic disturbances have a much lower impact. Conversely, low-income countries have much lower levels of transport network resilience, although some exceptions exist. The study further simulates the effect of potential disruptions – namely floods – to food transport networks which illustrate that the loss of network connectivity that results when links become impassable potentially affects millions of people.

Affordable healthy diets 
Despite disruptions, a 2021 study by FAO highlights that agrifood systems need to continuously guarantee access to food for all. In addition to the nearly 3 billion people in 2019 who could not afford a healthy diet that protects against malnutrition in all its forms, an additional 1 billion people (mostly on lower- and upper-middle-income countries) are at risk of not affording a healthy diet if a shock were to reduce their income by a third. FAO suggests that low-income countries in dire need of improving the affordability of healthy diets should focus on adopting long-term approaches that improve income levels and lower the cost of nutritious foods. In middle-income countries with many at risk, building resilience through the stabilization of incomes and diversification of agrifood systems should be the focus instead. Social protection programmes can also be effective policy tools during times of crisis but should be designed with the key challenges in mind.

Reyes et al. (2021) reviewed 12 global nutrition initiatives and found significant overlap in recommendations for a healthier food system. Their thematic analysis identified the following 13 different action themes, which are not necessarily mutually exclusive:

 Prioritize agricultural production of a diverse range of nutrient-rich foods;          
 Protect nutrient-rich wild foods and species-rich ecosystems on land and in oceans;      
 Support connectivity of smallholders and Small and Medium Sized Enterprises (SMEs) across food value chains;    
 Redesign safety net/social protection programs towards improved nutritional outcome;  
 Reduce food loss and food waste;
 Improve food quality and safety;
 Strengthen regulations for advertising and marketing;  
 Improve transparency in food labeling;     
 Encourage healthier eating through subsidies and promotions of healthy foods and taxes on unhealthy foods;  
 Create consumer demand for healthy foods (nutrition education & civic engagement);
 Improve acceptability of healthy foods;   
 Promote traditional foods and methods that impart nutritional benefits;
 Invest in metrics, research, and access to inform policy development.

Anticipatory action 
Anticipatory action is a growing area of disaster management that relies on data analysis to predict where crises might strike and act ahead of time to protect the assets and agency of farmers, fishers and herders to prepare them for widely different circumstances and contexts. An anticipatory action system involves crisis timelines, early warning systems, anticipatory actions, flexible financing and evidence. Risk-informed and shock-responsive social protection systems to provide support not only to routine beneficiaries, but also at-risk and crisis-prone populations. They can expand the provision of benefits according to the emerging needs of potential beneficiaries and enable them to invest and engage in productive activities. There is a growing body of evidence pointing towards the positive impact of anticipatory action, yet it is often fragmented, incomplete in scope, and in need of methodological improvements.

Improved basic and primary services 
Improved education, non-farm employment and cash transfers will be key in building capacities to absorb, adapt and transform by rural low-income households, in particular small-scale producers whose livelihoods are increasingly vulnerable to climate shocks and depletion of natural resources. For rural households, FAO's resilience index measurement and analysis (RIMA) model finds that in 23 countries indicate that education, income diversification and cash transfers mainly drove gradual improvements in resilience capacity. Analysis of another 12 countries showed that in more than half of cases, the most important pillar of resilience was access to productive and non-productive assets. Also important to household resilience was adaptive capacity, which depended critically on education and human capacity development within the household. Access to basic services, such as improved sanitation and safe drinking water, and primary services, especially schools, hospitals and agricultural markets, provided important support to household resilience, particularly in very arid zones and in pastoralist households.

Sustainable agriculture and food production 
Adopting more sustainable production practices is another important resilience-enhancing strategy. Moving towards more sustainable agriculture and food production involves protecting nature; restoring and rehabilitating natural environments; and sustainably managing food production systems. Agroecology is one approach that can help producers adapt to and mitigate climate change and there is increasing evidence of its benefits for the environment, biodiversity, farmers’ incomes, adaptation to climate change, and resilience to multiple shocks and stresses. Climate-smart agriculture (CSA) is another resilience-enhancing approach, which aims to promote food security, resilient livelihoods and climate-resilient agriculture. It is an integrated approach to managing landscapes – cropland, livestock, forests and fisheries – that address the interlinked challenges of food security and climate change. Additionally, significant reductions in food loss and waste, better resource-use efficiency and trade have an important role, as imports may be needed to fill domestic deficits where there are natural resource constraints

Sources

See also 

 Agriculture
 Food security
 Food industry
 Food system
 Supply chain resilience 
 Ecological resilience
 Climate resilience
 Soil resilience

References 

Agriculture
Systems
Hunger
Malnutrition
Diets